Prince Teymuraz Bagration of Mukhrani (21 August 1912 – 10 April 1992) was a Georgian-Russian nobleman and an émigré in the United States where he served as President of the Tolstoy Foundation, a New York-based charitable organization.

Life
He was born at Pavlovsk, Imperial Russia, into a formerly sovereign family. His father, Prince Konstantin Bagration-Mukhransky (1889–1915), a member of the Mukhrani branch of the Bagration family, formerly a royal dynasty of Georgia, was an Imperial Russian Army officer and was killed in World War I. Teymuraz's mother, Princess Tatiana Constantinovna of Russia (1890–1979) was a member of the imperial Romanov dynasty of Russia. Through her, he was second cousin of Prince Philip, Duke of Edinburgh and Princess Marina, Duchess of Kent.

Teymuraz Bagration left Russia after the 1917 Revolution, first living in Switzerland and then settling in Yugoslavia.  Prince Bagration graduated in 1932 from the Krymskiy Cadet School and then studied at the Yugoslav Military Academy.  He served for ten years in the Guards Mounted Artillery Regiment of the Royal Yugoslav Army.  During World War II, he served in the Royal Yugoslav Army. After the war, he emigrated to the U.S. and was invited to join the Tolstoy Foundation in 1949. He became Executive Director of the Foundation in 1979 and led the organization from 1986 until his death in New York in 1992.

On 5 July 2007, Bagration's unique archive was presented by his second wife, Princess Irina, to the National Parliamentary Library of Georgia.

Personal life
Bagration was married twice. The first time he was married in Belgrade to Katarina Racic (4 Jul 1919, London - 20 December 1946), grand-daughter of Serbian Prime minister Nikola Pašić  on 27 October 1940. At the time of the wedding he was 28 and she was 21, but the marriage ended with Katarina's death at the age of 27.

The second marriage was with Countess Irina Czernysheva-Besobrasova (born 26 September 1926, Neuilly-sur-Seine - 9 July 2015, New York City), the daughter of Count Sergei Aleksandrovich Czernyshev-Besobrasov and Countess Elizaveta Sheremeteva.  Irina was an older sister of Countess Xenia Czernyshev-Besobrasov, who married 1953 Archduke Rudolf Syringus, youngest son of Karl I of Austria, the last Austrian Emperor.  This marriage was celebrated on 27 November 1949 and took place in New York City. He was 37 and she was 23.  There was no issue of either marriage.

Ancestry

References

External links
Biography of Teymuraz K. Bagration. The Tolstoy Foundation website. Retrieved on 7 May 2007.
. Retrieved on 7 2007.

1912 births
1992 deaths
House of Mukhrani
Russian princes
Yugoslav emigrants to the United States
White Russian emigrants to Yugoslavia